Long Thành is a township in Long Thành District, Đồng Nai Province, southern Vietnam, 70 km northwest of Vũng Tàu, 20 km southwest of Biên Hòa. The town is located on the Route 51 that connects industrial Biên Hòa city with the petroleum installation and seaside resort at Vũng Tàu city.

Facilities
This town is adjacent to the planned Long Thanh International Airport. Local economy is based on trading and services for the surrounding rubber and durian farms. In the suburbs of the town, there are industrial parks and a golf course.

Planned developments
When Ho Chi Minh City – Long Thanh – Dau Day Expressway is completed, this town will become a component city of the Ho Chi Minh City Metropolitan Area. Then the city's economy will be based on services for Long Thanh International Airport.  There is a plan to relocate the Đồng Nai administration offices from Biên Hòa city to this town.

References

Communes of Đồng Nai province
Populated places in Đồng Nai province
District capitals in Vietnam
Townships in Vietnam